The following is a list of schools operated by the Roman Catholic Archdiocese of Chicago, which covers Cook and Lake counties, followed by a list of former high schools closed after 1959 and former K-8 schools closed after 1983.

In 1985 Joseph Bernardin, then the head of the archdiocese, stated that as costs increased to operate Catholic schools, it was likely merging or closure would result. In 1990 Bernardin stated that 18 schools were to close that year. He suggested that some parishes may change from having their own schools to having joint schools with other parishes, or regional schools. Ultimately 25 schools closed in 1990. In 1994 an additional 24 were shuttered. From 1990 to 2004, the number of Catholic schools shuttered exceeded 100.

Schools

9–12 schools

9–12 schools in Chicago

Near West and Northwest Sides
 Cristo Rey Jesuit High School
 Holy Trinity High School
 St. Ignatius College Preparatory School
 Our Lady of Tepeyac High School (girls only)
 Christ the King Jesuit College Prep High School

North Side
 DePaul College Prep – relaunch of former Gordon Tech High School, 2014
 Josephinum Academy (Near west/northwest side of Chicago) (girls only)
 Resurrection High School (girls only)

Far Northwest Side
 Saint Patrick High School (boys only)

Southwest Side
 Brother Rice High School (boys only)
 Marist High School (boys and girls)
 Mother McAuley Liberal Arts High School (girls only)
 St. Rita of Cascia High School (boys only)

South Side
 De La Salle Institute (boys and girls attend separate campuses)
 St. Francis de Sales High School
 Leo Catholic High School (boys only)
 Mount Carmel High School (boys only)

9–12 schools in Cook County
This list excludes Chicago.

Northern Cook County
 Loyola Academy (Wilmette)
 Notre Dame College Prep (Niles) (boys only)
 Regina Dominican High School (Wilmette) (girls only)

Northwest Cook County

 St. Viator High School (Arlington Heights)

Western Cook County
 Fenwick High School (Oak Park)
 Nazareth Academy (La Grange Park)
 Trinity High School (River Forest) (girls only)

Southwestern Cook County
 St. Laurence High School (Burbank) (boys and girls)

Southern Cook County
 Marian Catholic High School (Chicago Heights)

9–12 schools in Lake County
 Carmel Catholic High School (Mundelein)
 Cristo Rey St. Martin College Prep (Waukegan)
 Woodlands Academy of the Sacred Heart (Lake Forest) (girls only)

PK-8 schools

PK-8 schools in Chicago
PK-8 schools on the Near West and Northwest Sides
 St. Agnes of Bohemia School
 St. Angela School
 Children of Peace School
 Epiphany School
 St. Helen School
 St. Hyacinth School
 St. John Berchmans School
 St. Mary of the Angels School
 St. Malachy School
 St. Patrick's Academy
 St. Nicholas Ukrainian Cathedral School 
 Our Lady of Grace
 Our Lady of Tepeyac School
 Our Lady of the Westside School
 St. Pius V School
 St. Procopius School
 St. Stanislaus Kostka School

PK-8 schools on the North Side
 Alphonsus Academy and Center for the Arts
 St. Andrew School
 St. Benedict School
 St. Clement School
 St. Clement, located in Lincoln Park, is the parish school of St. Clement Church
 St. Cornelius School
 St. Eugene School
 Frances Xavier Warde School
 In 1994 Holy Name School, which had been facing a decline in the number of enrolled students, merged into Warde, and the former Holy Name became Warde School, Old St. Patrick's Campus so it could house the increasing number of students at Xavier.
 St. Hilary School
 Immaculate Conception School (7263 West Talcott Avenue)
 St. Josaphat School
 St. Juliana School
 St. Margaret Mary School
 St. Mary of the Angels School
 St. Mary's, located in Bucktown, is the parish school of St. Mary of the Angels Church
 St. Mary of the Lake School
 St. Mary of the Woods School
 St. Matthias/Transfiguration School
 The school, in the Lincoln Square community, is the parish school of the St. Matthias and Transfiguration of Our Lord parishes. the former Transfiguration School consolidated into St. Matthias in 2002; The St. Matthias building became the site of St. Matthias/Transfiguration as the Transfiguration building closed
 Mount Carmel Academy
 Queen of All Saints School
 Queen of Angels School
 St. Tarcissus School
 St. Thecla School
 St. Thomas of Canterbury School
Northside Catholic Academy
 Our Lady of the Wayside

PK-8 schools on the Far Northwest Side
 St. Constance School
 St. Edward School
 St. Ferdinand School
 St. Francis Borgia School
 St. Genevieve School
 St. Ladislaus School
 St. Monica Academy
 Our Lady of Victory School
 St. Pascal School
 St. Priscilla School
 St. Robert Bellarmine School
 St. Viator School
 St. William School

PK-8 schools on the Southwest Side

 St. Barnabas School
 St. Bede the Venerable School
 St. Bruno School
 St. Cajetan School
 Christ the King School
 St. Christina School
 St. Daniel the Prophet School
 St. Gall School
 St. John Fisher School
 St. Mary Star of the Sea School
 The Most Holy Redeemer Elementary School
 Nativity B. V. M. School
 St. Nicholas of Tolentine School
 Our Lady of the Snows School
 Pope John Paul II Catholic School
 The sponsoring parishes of Pope John Paul II are Immaculate Conception Parish (2745 West 44th Street), St. Pancratius Parish, Our Lady of Fatima Parish, and Five Holy Martyrs Parish. John Paul II was formed in 1999 by the mergers of the parish schools of the four parishes; the Immaculate Conception and St. Pancriatus campus sites were immediately closed, while the Our Lady of Fatima and Five Holy Martyrs sites became a part of John Paul II. The Our Lady of Fatima site closed in 2003, leaving the Five Holy Martyrs site as the sole site for John Paul II. John Paul II, the sponsoring parishes, and the three closed sites are in the Brighton Park neighborhood.
 Queen of Martyrs School
 Queen of the Universe School
 St. Rene Goupil School
 St. Richard School
 St. Symphorosa School
 St. Therese Chinese Catholic School - It has a campus in Chinatown and another in Bridgeport. It was established in 1941. In 1990, almost all of the students were ethnic Chinese. In 2018 the archdiocese announced that St. Barbara School would merge into St. Therese as their respective parishes were also merging. In 2019 the St. Barbara School became the St. Therese Bridgeport campus.
 St. Turibius School
 St. Walter School

PK-8 schools on the South Side
 Academy of St. Benedict the African
 The school has two campuses, including the Laflin Campus at 6020 South Laflin and the Stewart Campus at 6547 South Stewart. The Laflin Campus is located in West Englewood. The Stewart campus is in Englewood. The school, formerly known as Englewood Catholic Academy, was formed in 1984 from the consolidation of several parish schools, including St. Benedict the African School, St. Bernard School, St. Brendan School, St. Justin Martyr School, and St. Carthage School.
 St. Ailbe School
 Annunciata School
 St. Barnabas School
 Bridgeport Catholic Academy
 Christ the King School
 St. Columbanus School
 St. Dorothy School
 St. Elizabeth School
 It is in proximity to the former Robert Taylor Homes.
 St. Ethelreda School
 St. Florian School
 St. Gabriel School
 St. Helena of the Cross School
 St. Jerome School
 Holy Angels School
 St. John de la Salle Academy of Fine Arts
 Santa Lucia School
 St. Margaret of Scotland School
 St. Michael School
 Our Lady of the Gardens School
 St. Philip Neri School
 St. Sabina Academy
 St. Therese Chinese Catholic School St. Barbara Campus
 St. Thomas the Apostle School
 Visitation School

PK-8 schools in Cook CountyThis list excludes Chicago.PK-8 schools in northern Cook County
 St. Catherine Laboure School (Glenview)
 SS. Faith, Hope & Charity School (Winnetka)
 St. Francis Xavier School (Wilmette)
 St. Joan of Arc School (Evanston)
 St. John Brebeuf School (Niles)
 The parishes of St. John Brebeuf are St. John Brebeuf (Niles), St. Isaac Jogues (Niles), St. Martha (Morton Grove), and Our Lady of Ransom. The St. Isaac Jogues School closed in 1992, the St. Martha School closed in 2000, and Our Lady of Ransom School closed in 2004.
 St. Joseph School (Wilmette) (closed in 1986, reopened in 1998)
 The school is the parish school of St. Joseph Church.
 Mary, Seat of Wisdom School (Park Ridge)
 This is the parish school for Mary, Seat of Wisdom Church.
 St. Norbert School (Northbrook)
 Our Lady of Perpetual Help (Glenview)
 St. Paul of the Cross School (Park Ridge)
 The school is the parish school of St. Paul of the Cross Church.
 St. Peter School (Skokie)
St. Athanasius (St. A's)- Evanston
 Pope John XXIII School (Evanston)
 The school is the parish school for the St. Nicholas Parish and St. Mary Parish in Evanston . The school was formed in 1986 by the merger of St. Nicholas School and St. Mary School. Pope John XXIII occupied the former St. Nicholas building, and the St. Mary building closed. In 1998 the convent was converted into a preschool .
 Sacred Heart School (Winnetka)

PK-8 schools in northwest Cook County
 St. Alphonsus Liguori School (Prospect Heights)
 St. Emily School (Mount Prospect)
 St. Hubert School (Hoffman Estates)
 St. James School (Arlington Heights)
 Our Lady of Destiny School (Des Plaines)
 Our Lady of the Wayside School (Arlington Heights)
 Queen of the Rosary School (Elk Grove Village)
 St. Raymond School (Mount Prospect)
 St. Theresa School (Palatine)
 St. Thomas of Villanova School (Palatine)
 St. Zachary School (Des Plaines)
 Holy Family Catholic Academy (Inverness)

PK-8 schools in western Cook county
 Ascension School (Oak Park)
 St. Catherine of Siena/St. Lucy School (Oak Park) - In 2020 the school had 165 students; 80 of them lived in the southern part of Austin, Chicago, and with the remainder from other parts of Chicago, Oak Park, Bellwood, Berwyn, Forest Park, Maywood, and Westchester.
 St. Celestine School (Elmwood Park)
 St. Cletus School (La Grange)
 Divine Providence School (Westchester)
 St. Frances of Rome School (Cicero)
 St. Francis Xavier School (La Grange)
 St. Giles School (Oak Park)
 St. John of the Cross School (Western Springs)
 St. John Vianney School (Northlake)
 St. Leonard School (Berwyn)
 St. Luke School (River Forest)
 St. Mary School (Riverside)
 St. Odilo School (Berwyn)
 Our Lady of Charity School (Cicero)
 St. Vincent Ferrer School (River Forest)

PK-8 schools in southwestern Cook County
 St. Albert the Great School (Burbank)
 St. Alexander School (Palos Heights)
 St. Alphonsus/St. Patrick School (Lemont)
 St. Bernadette School (Evergreen Park)
 Cardinal Joseph Bernardin School (Orland Hills) (school for the parishes of St. Stephen, Deacon & Martyr and St. Julie Billiart, Tinley Park, St. Elizabeth Seton Orland Hills and St. Francis of Assisi, Orland Park
 Groundbreaking in 1999 occurred, making it the first newly built school building for the archdiocese after a 1966 project. It was scheduled to open in 2000.
 St. Catherine of Alexandria School (Oak Lawn)
 St. Christopher School (Midlothian)
 SS Cyril & Methodius School (Lemont)
 St. Damian School (Oak Forest)
 St. Gerald School (Oak Lawn)
 St. Germaine School (Oak Lawn)
 St. Linus School (Oak Lawn)
 Most Holy Redeemer School (Evergreen Park)
 St. Patricia School (Hickory Hills)
 White Pines Academy (Lemont)

PK-8 schools in southern Cook County
 St. Agnes School (Chicago Heights)
 St. Benedict School (Blue Island)
 Infant Jesus of Prague School (Flossmoor)

PK-8 schools in Lake County
 St. Anastasia School (Waukegan)
 St. Anne School  (Barrington)
 St. Bede School (Ingleside)
 East Lake Academy (Lake Forest)
 St. Francis de Sales School (Lake Zurich)
 St. Gilbert School (Grayslake)
 Holy Cross School (Deerfield)
 St. Joseph School (Libertyville)
 St. Joseph School (Round Lake)
 St. Mary School (Buffalo Grove)
 Most Blessed Trinity Academy (Waukegan)
 Formerly Academy of our Lady
 Our Lady of Humility School (Beach Park)
 St. Patrick School (Wadsworth)
 Prince of Peace School (Lake Villa)
 Transfiguration School (Wauconda)

K-8 schools

K-8 schools in Chicago

K-8 schools on the Near West and Northwest Sides
 St. Ann School
 Maternity B. V. M. School
 St. Paul-Our Lady of Vilna School

K-8 schools on the North Side
 Sacred Heart Schools

K-8 schools on the South Side
 Our Lady of Guadalupe School
 Sacred Heart School

K-8 schools in Cook County
This list excludes Chicago.

K-8 schools in northern Cook County
 St. Athanasius School (Evanston)

K-8 schools in northwest Cook County
 St. John the Evangelist School (Streamwood)

K-8 schools in southwest Cook County
 St. George School (Tinley Park)
 Incarnation School (Palos Heights)
 St. Michael School (Orland Park)
 Our Lady of the Ridge School (Chicago Ridge)
 St. Patricia School (Hickory Hills)
 St. Linus School (Oak Lawn)

K-8 schools in south Cook County
 Christ Our Savior School, East Campus in Calumet City

K-8 schools in Lake County
 St. Gilbert School (Grayslake)
 St. Mary of Annunciation School (Mundelein)

K-7 schools
Chicago, south side
 Immaculate Conception School

4–8 schools
(Lake County)
 School of St. Mary (Lake Forest)

5–8 schools
(Chicago, Near West and Northwest)
 Chicago Jesuit Academy (boys only)
 San Miguel School – Gary Comer Campus (located in the Austin neighborhood ) (opened fall 2002)

6–8 schools
(Chicago, Southwest)
 San Miguel School – Back of the Yards Campus (opened in 1995)

PK-3 schools
(Chicago, North Side)
 Cardinal Bernardin Early Childhood Center
 Bernardin ECC has two campuses: one at St. Teresa of Avila Parish at 1940 North Kenmore at Armitage, and one at St. Bonaventure Parish at 1651 West Diversey at Paulina. Bernardin ECC opened in 1998 in the former campuses of Saint Bonaventure School (closed in 1990) and St. Teresa of Avila School (closed in 1996)

PK-2 schools
(Chicago, North Side)
 Immaculate Conception School (1431 North Park Avenue, closed in 1985, reopened in 2002)

K-1 schools
(Cook County, excluding Chicago, far northwest)
 Holy Family Catholic Academy (Inverness)

PK-K schools
(Chicago, Near West/Northwest)
 Old St. Mary's School

Former schools
The enrollment of Chicago Archdiocese Catholic schools was over 95,000 circa 2012. In 2020 this figure declined to circa 71,000, and that year the archdiocese closed five grade schools. The number of schools open declined to 209 in 2020.

Former high schools

Former high schools in Chicago
Closure date not stated:
 St. Casimir High School (St. Casimir Academy changed name to Maria High School in 1952. St. Casimir Commercial High School changed name to Our Lady of Tepeyac High School in 1991.)
 St. Catherine of Siena (See 1977 for Siena Catholic High School)

Closed in 1960:
 St. Dominic High School
 St. Philomena Commercial High School

Closed in 1961:
 St. Josaphat Commercial High School
 St. Malachy High School
 St. Martin Commercial High School

Closed in 1962:
 Corpus Christi High School (succeeded by Hales Franciscan High School)
 Loretto High School (Englewood)
 St. Clement Commercial High School

Closed in 1966:
 St. Alphonsus Commercial High School

Closed in 1967:
 Sacred Heart High School (May Street)
 St. Elizabeth High School

Closed in 1968:
 DePaul University AcademySometimes given simply as DePaul Academy.
 St. Michael High SchoolNot to be confused with St. Michael's Central Catholic High School.

Closed in 1969:
 Providence High School
 St. Columbkille High School
 St. Mel High School
 Saints Peter and Paul High School
 St. Pius V Commercial High School

Closed in 1970:
 Cardinal Stritch High School
 St. Patrick High School for Girls (West Side)
 St. Phillip Basilica High School

Closed in 1972:
 Loretto Academy (Woodlawn)
 Mercy High School

Closed in 1973:
 Little Flower High School

Closed in 1974:
 Angel Guardian High School

Closed in 1976:
 St. Mary High School

Closed in 1977:
 St. Paul High School
 St. Stanislaus Kostka High School
 Siena High School

Closed in 1978:
 St. Michael Central Catholic High School

Closed in 1979:
 St. Sebastian High School

Closed in 1980:
 Heart of Mary High School
 St. Augustine High School
 St. Thomas the Apostle High School

Closed in 1981:
 St. Ann High School
 St. Procopius High School

Closed in 1982:
 Immaculata High School
 Mercy Mission High School

Closed in 1983:
 Aquinas Dominican High School

Closed in 1985:
 St. Mary of Perpetual Help High School (coed)

Closed in 1988:
 Holy Family Academy (girls)
 Mendel Catholic Preparatory High School
 Unity High School (girls) (merged into St. Martin De Porres Academy, building closed)
 Visitation High School
 Willobrord Catholic High School (coed) (merged into St. Martin De Porres Academy, building closed)

Closed in 1989:
 Alvernia High School

Closed in 1990:
 Archbishop Quigley Preparatory Seminary (South) (boys only)

Closed in 1993:
 Academy of the Sacred Heart (girls) (as of 2007 the building is used by Sacred Heart Schools)

Closed in 1994:
 Cathedral High School (coed)

Closed in 1996:
 St. Joseph High School (coed)

Closed in 1997:
 St. Martin De Porres Academy (coed)

Closed in 1999:
 Archbishop Weber High School (boys)
 Academy of Our Lady (Longwood Academy) (girls)

Closed in 2001:
 Madonna High School
 St. Barbara High School

Closed in 2002:
 Lourdes High School (girls) (students accepted at De La Salle Institute West Campus)

Closed in 2003:
 Good Counsel High School (girls)

Closed in 2007:
 Archbishop Quigley Preparatory Seminary North (boys only)

Closed in 2013:
 Maria High School (girls only)
 St. Gregory the Great High School
 St. Scholastica Academy (girls only)

Closed in 2016:
 Notre Dame High School for Girls  (girls only)

Former high schools in Cook CountyThis list excludes Chicago.''

Closed in 1960:
 Wilmette Mallinckrodt High School (Wilmette)

Closed in 1968:
 Aurora Roncalli High School for Boys and Madonna Catholic High School consolidated to form Aurora Central Catholic High School

Closed in 1969:
 St. George High School (Evanston)
 St. Patrick Academy (Des Plaines)

Closed in 1970:
 Marywood High School (Evanston)

Closed in 1983:
 Mother of Sorrows High School (Blue Island)

Closed in 1987:
 Sacred Heart of Mary High School (Rolling Meadows) (absorbed by Saint Viator High School)

Closed in 1991:
 Saint Vincent de Paul High School Seminary (boys) (Lemont, Illinois)

Closed in 1994
 Saint Louise de Marillac High School (girls) (Northfield) (absorbed by Loyola Academy, building closed)

Closed in 2004:
 Holy Cross High School (boys) (River Grove) (students accepted at Guerin College Preparatory High School)

Closed in 2005:
 Immaculate Heart of Mary High School (absorbed by St. Joseph High School) (Westchester) 

Closed in 2016
 Seton Academy, South Holland

Closed in 2017
 Queen of Peace High School (girls) (Burbank) students accepted at St. Laurence High School 

Closed in 2020
Guerin College Preparatory High School (River Grove)

Closed in 2021
St. Joseph High School (Westchester)

Former K-8 schools

Former K-8 schools in Chicago
Closed in 1984:
 Assumption B.V.M. (2817 West 24th Street)
 St. Kevin School
 St. Bernard School (consolidated into Englewood Catholic Academy, now St. Benedict the African Academy; building closed; as of 2007 the site is used as a campus for St. Benedict the African)
 St. Brendan School (consolidated into Englewood Catholic Academy, now St. Benedict the African Academy; building closed)
 St. Carthage School (consolidated into Englewood Catholic Academy, now St. Benedict the African Academy; building closed)
 Holy Rosary School (merged with St. Salomea into St. Mark the Evangelist School, building closed)
 Immaculate Conception School (8739 S. Exchange Street) (merged with St. Mary Magdalen and S. S. Peter & Paul to form Jesus, Our Brother, building closed) (Jesus, Our Brother closed in 1994)
 S. S. Peter & Paul (2938 East 91st Street) (Merged with St. Mary Magdalen and Immaculate Conception to form Jesus, Our Brother, building closed) (Jesus, Our Brother closed in 1994)

Closed in 1985:
 St. George School (911 West 32nd Place) (Consolidated into Bridgeport Catholic Academy)
 S. S. Peter and Paul (12255 South Emerald Street) (merged with Assumption, BVM, 12238 South Parnell)

Closed in 1986:
 All Saints School
 Our Lady of Hungary School
 St. Frances Xavier Cabrini School
 St. Mel School

Closed in 1987:
 St. Agnes School
 St. Augustine School
 St. George School (9536 South Ewing Street)
 Our Lady of Vilna (merged with St. Paul to form St. Paul/Our Lady of Vilna, building closed)

Closed in 1988:
 Notre Dame de Chicago School
 St. Mary School
 St. Francis of Assisi (merged with Our Lady of the Angels School, building closed) (Our Lady of the Angels closed in 1999)

Closed in 1990:
 Holy Trinity School
 S. S. Peter and Paul School (3737 South Paulina Street)
 Sacred Heart of Jesus School
 Saint Bonaventure School (building has been used by the Cardinal Bernadin Early Childhood Center since 1998)
 St. Charles Lwanga School (opened in 1971 from consolidation of St. Cecelia and St. Anne)
 St. Fidelis School
 St. Francis de Paula
 St. John of God
 St. Mark the Evangelist (opened in 1984 from consolidation of St. Salomea and Holy Rosary)
 St. Peter Canisius School (closed 1990)
 St. Sebastian School
 Assumption BVM (12238 South Parnell) (merged with St. Catherine of Genoa; consolidated school closed in 1999)
 Holy Cross (consolidated with S. S. Cyril/Methodius and Clara, renamed St. Gelasius, building closed)
 St. Ludmilla (merged with St. Casimir, building closed)
 Academy St. Benedict The African – May St. Campus (site closure)
 Bridgeport Catholic Academy – Early Childhood East (site closure)
 Bridgeport Catholic Academy – Early Childhood West (site closure)

Closed in 1991:
 St. Roman School
 St. Veronica School (consolidated into Resurrection Catholic Academy, building closed)

Closed in 1992:
 Providence of God School
 St. Francis de Sales School

Closed in 1993:
 Corpus Christi School
 St. Hedwig School
 St. Kilian School
 St. Michael the Archangel School
 St. Wenceslaus School
 Our Lady of Lourdes School (consolidated with Blessed Sacrament, Central Park; building closed)

Closed in 1994:
 Holy Name Cathedral Elementary School (building became a part of Francis Xavier Warde School)
 Jesus, Our Brother School
 Little Flower School
 Our Lady of Pompeii School
 St. Anselm School
 St. Laurence School
 St. Rita of Cascia School
 St. Ignatius School (consolidated into Northside Catholic Academy, campus closed)
 St. Jerome School (consolidated into Northside Catholic Academy, campus closed)
 St. Timothy School (consolidated into Northside Catholic Academy, campus closed)

Closed in 1995:
 St. John Bosco School

Closed in 1996:
 St. Stephen School
 St. Teresa of Avila School (building has been used by Cardinal Bernadin Early Childhood Center since 1998)

Closed in 1997:
 St. Joachim School

Closed in 1998:
 Our Lady Help of Christians School (closed 1998)
 Our Lady of Sorrows School
 St. Adrian School
 St. Anthony School
 St. Basil School
 Our Lady of the Westside – Precious Blood Campus (site closure)

Closed in 1999:
 Assumption BVM/ St. Catherine of Genoa School
 Our Lady of the Angels School
 Our Lady of Peace School
 Five Holy Martyrs School (consolidated into Pope John Paul II Catholic School) 
 Immaculate Conception School (consolidated into Pope John Paul II Catholic School in 1999, building closed) 
 Our Lady of Fatima School (consolidated into Pope John Paul II Catholic School)  (the building site closed in 2003)
 St. Pancratius School (consolidated into Pope John Paul II Catholic School in 1999, building closed) 

Closed in 2000:
 Bridgeport Catholic Academy – North Campus (site closure)

Closed in 2001:
 St. Columba
 St. Leo the Great
 Bridgeport Catholic Academy – West Campus (site closure)
 Children of Peace – Holy Family (site closure)
 McKinley Park – St. Maurice Campus (site closure)
 Northside Catholic Academy – St. Gregory Campus (site closure)

Closed in 2002:
Blessed Sacrament / Our Lady of Lourdes School
 It was in Lawndale. Its peak enrollment was circa 250, and in the year it closed it had 227 students. Parents led a campaign to oppose the closure, arguing that the archdiocese had asked for a fundraising, which the parents did, but moved to close it anyway.
Holy Innocents School
Holy Name of Mary School
McKinley Park Catholic School
St. Ambrose School
St. Clare do Montefalco School
St. Denis School
St. Gelasius School
St. James School
St. Joseph School (1065 North Orleans Street)
St. Joseph School (4831 South Hermitage Street Chicago
St. Michael School
Transfiguration School (consolidated with St. Matthias, building closed)

Closed in 2003:
 Our Lady of Mercy School
 St. Thaddeus School
 Pope John Paul II – Our Lady of Fatima Site (site closure)

Closed in 2004:
 St. Mark School
 St. Stanislaus Bishop and Martyr School

Closed in 2019:
 St. Barbara School (Bridgeport) In 2018 the archdiocese announced that St. Barbara School would merge into St. Therese as their respective parishes were also merging. In 2019 the St. Barbara School became the St. Therese Bridgeport campus.

Closed in 2023:
 St. Bartholomew School

Closure date unstated:
 St. Bride
 St. Rita of Casia

Former K-8 schools in Cook County
Date not stated:
Divine Savior School (Norridge)

Closed in 1984:
 Alexine Academy (LaGrange Park) (operated as private)
 St. John Chrysostom School (Bellwood)

Closed in 1986:
 St. Mary School (Evanston (consolidated with St. Nicholas in Evanston to form Pope John XXIII School; building closed)

Closed in 1987:
 St. Gerard Majella School (Markham)
 Ascension/ St. Susanna School (Harvey) (merged with St. John Baptist to form Mary of Nazareth of Harvey, building closed)

Closed in 1988:
 St. Dionysus School (Cicero)
 St. Joseph School (Chicago Heights)

Closed in 1989:
 Mother of Sorrows Boarding School (Blue Island) (operated as private)

Closed in 1990:
 Mount Carmel School (Chicago Heights)
 Seven Holy Founders (Calumet Park)
 St. Rosalie School (Harwood Heights)

Closed in 1992:
 St. Anthony School (Cicero)
 St. Charles Borromeo School (Melrose Park)
 St. James School (Maywood)
 St. Isaac Jogues School (Niles (students went to Our Lady of Ransom and St. John Brebeuf School, so this is considered a merger, building closed)

Closed in 1996:
 St. Joseph the Worker School (Wheeling)
 St. Pius X School (Stickney)

Closed in 1997:
 St. Gertrude School (Franklin Park)

Closed in 2000:
 St. Martha School (Morton Grove)

Closed in 2001:
 St. Emeric School (Country Club Hills)
 St. Hugh School (Lyons)
 St. Isidore, The Farmer School (Blue Island)
 The archdiocese determined the school was too expensive to maintain.
 St. Simeon School (Bellwood)

Closed in 2002:
 Mary of Nazareth School (Harvey)
 Mary Queen of Heaven School (Cicero)
 Our Lady of Mount Carmel School (Melrose Park)
 St. James School (Sauk Village)

Closed in 2003:
 St. Anne School (Hazel Crest)
 St. Eulalia School (Maywood)
 St. Lambert School (Skokie)
 St. Philip the Apostle School (Northfield)

Closed in 2004:
 Holy Ghost School (South Holland) (students accepted to Christ Our Savior)
 Our Lady of Knock School (Calumet City) (students accepted to Christ Our Savior)
 Our Lady of Ransom School (Niles)
 OLR students were absorbed by St. John Brebeuf School, St. Paul of the Cross School, and Mary, Seat of Wisdom School
 Queen of Apostles School (Riverdale) (students accepted to Christ Our Savior)
 St. Andrew of the Apostle (Calumet City) (building reopened for Christ Our Savior School – East Campus)
 St. Jude the Apostle School (South Holland) (building reopened for Christ Our Savior School – West Campus)
 St. Victor School (Calumet City) (students accepted to Christ Our Savior)

Closed in 2006:
 Our Lady of Loretto School (Hometown)
 St. Stanislaus Bishop and Martyr Elementary School (Posen)

Closed in 2009:
 St Beatrice School (Schiller Park)
St. Mary Of Czestochowa School (Cicero)

Closed in 2012: The school only had 64 students enrolled.
 St. Barbara School (Brookfield)
Closed in 2013:
 St. Kieran School (Chicago Heights)
 St. Bernardine School (Forest Park)
Closed in 2015:
 St. Lawrence O'Toole School (Matteson)

Closed in 2016:
 St. Edmund School (Oak Park)

Closed in 2017:
 St. Joseph School (Homewood) - It had 64 students at the time of closure.
 St. Louis De Montfort School (Oak Lawn) - It had 133 students at the time of closure.

Closed in 2018: None of the schools had 150 or more students.
 St. Cyprian School in northwest suburban River Grove
 Holy Cross School in north suburban Deerfield
 Our Lady of the Ridge Catholic School in southwest suburban Chicago Ridge
 St. Michael the Archangel School in the city's South Chicago neighborhood - It had 80 students in 2018.

Closed in 2019: 
Divine Infant Jesus School: The archdiocese cited a decline in enrollment and financing and desired to operate only one parish school once Divine Infant Jesus Church and Divine Providence Church (both churches are now known as Mary, Mother of Divine Grace Parish) united as one parish in July 2019 as a part of the Renew My Church initiative.  A majority of the students transferred to Divine Providence School.

Closed in 2020: - The archdiocese cited a decline in the student population and budgeting problems.
St. Colette School in Rolling Meadows - The student population from circa 2017 to 2020 declined by 97. In 2020 its budget deficit was $500,000.
St. Jane de Chantal School in Chicago’s Garfield Ridge neighborhood. - In the 2015-2016 school year, the school had 281 students. This figure declined to 272, 245, and then 202 in subsequent school years. In total, from circa 2017 to 2020 the student population declined by 92. In the 2018-2019 school year it had 202 students and 20 employees, with 14 of them in the faculty. The archdiocese stated that the school could stay open if the community raised $357,000, but the community did not do so.
St. Joseph School in Round Lake - The student population from circa 2016 to 2020 declined by 92. The archdiocese asked if there were interested benefactors, but the archdiocese was unsuccessful.
St. Louise de Marillac School in LaGrange Park - The student population from circa 2019 to 2020 declined by 28. The archdiocese asked if there were interested benefactors, but the archdiocese was unsuccessful.
St. Maria Goretti School in Schiller Park - From circa 2017 to 2020 the student population declined by 73. The archdiocese stated that the school could remain open if it had 150 students for 2019-2020, but the student population was below that.

Closed in 2021:
 Christ Our Savior School (West Campus in South Holland)
 St. Anne School (Lansing)
 St. Joseph School (Summit)
 Sacred Heart School (Melrose Park)

Former K-8 schools in Lake County
Closed in 1984:
 St. Bartholomew School (Waukegan (consolidated into Lakeshore Catholic Academy, building closed)

Closed in 1990:
 Holy Rosary School (North Chicago)

Closed in 2014:
 St. Maria del Popolo School (Mundelein)
 St. James School (Highwood)
 Merged with Holy Cross School of Deerfield, Illinois

Closed in 2016:
 St. Peter School (Antioch)

References

Chicago-related lists
Chicago
Chicago Roman Catholic
Private schools in Chicago